Mary Parets was an Argentine actress. In 1943 she starred in Benito Perojo's Stella. Other notable films include The Boys Didn't Wear Hair Gel Before (1937), Ambición (1939) and Los pagares de Mendieta (1939).

Selected filmography
 The Boys Didn't Wear Hair Gel Before (1937)

References

External links
 

Possibly living people
Argentine film actresses